Kopeng Obed Bapela (born 28 February 1958) is a South African politician currently serving as the Deputy Minister of Co-operative Governance and Traditional Affairs in the South African Government in the cabinet of Cyril Ramaphosa. Bapela is also the husband of the former City of Johannesburg Council Speaker, Constance Bapela.

Early life and career
Bapela was born in 1958 in the Township of Alexandra in Gauteng, South Africa.

Bapela took part in the 1976 Soweto uprising. Bapela became a member of the African National Congress (ANC) and took part in their underground structures from 1979. Bapela also became one of the founding members of the United Democratic Front (UDF) in 1983.

Bapela was detained several times during the 1980s and appeared in two political trials in Port Elizabeth and Alexandra between 1986 and 1987 and from 1987 and 1990.

After Nelson Mandela became the President of South Africa in 1994 in the country's first democratic elections, Bapela became a Member of the Gauteng Provincial Legislature from 1994 to 1999.

In 2010 Bapela became the Deputy Minister of Communication in the Cabinet of Jacob Zuma. Bapela was them moved to another position in 2011 when he became the Deputy Minister in the Presidency for Performance Monitoring and Evaluation, until 2014 when Bapela became the Deputy Minister of Co-operative Governance and Traditional Affairs in the Second Cabinet of Jacob Zuma.

Personal life
Bapela is married to Constance Bapela (also known as Connie) who served as the Council Speaker of the City of Johannesburg under Parks Tau. The couple have three children.

Obed's wife Constance died in February 2018 at the age of 55 after suffering from a long illness.

On 27 February 2016, Bapela was admitted to Milpark Hospital in Johannesburg after he was involved in a car accident on N12 highway.

Education and current portfolios
The Deputy Minister holds a Diploma in Journalism and various other Certificates such varied fields as community and organisational development; safety and security; and policy development. As a Member of Parliament he sat in the Portfolio Committee of Foreign Affairs and Trade and Industry, before becoming Deputy Minister for DPME.

See also

African Commission on Human and Peoples' Rights
Constitution of South Africa
History of the African National Congress
Politics in South Africa
Provincial governments of South Africa

References

External links
 

Living people
1958 births
African National Congress politicians
Members of the National Assembly of South Africa
People from Alexandra, Gauteng